Syllepte argillosa is a moth in the family Crambidae. It was described by Christian Guillermet in 1996. It is found on Réunion in the Indian Ocean.

References

Moths described in 1996
argillosa
Moths of Africa